Sumnerville is an unincorporated community in Ottawa County, Kansas, United States.  It is located north of Minneapolis.

History
A post office was opened in Sumnerville in 1867, and remained in operation until it was discontinued in 1895.

Education
The community is served by North Ottawa County USD 239 public school district.

References

Further reading

External links
 Ottawa County maps: Current, Historic, KDOT

Unincorporated communities in Kansas
Unincorporated communities in Ottawa County, Kansas